is a Japanese swimmer who specializes in the men's 200 metre butterfly. He won the silver medal in the men's 200 metre butterfly event at the 2016 Summer Olympics. Sakai was in 6th position at the 150 mark, and finished 0.04 seconds behind Michael Phelps.

At the 2015 World Aquatics Championships in Kazan, Sakai finished 4th in the 200 metre butterfly, 0.14 seconds outside the medals.

References

External links

 

1995 births
Living people
Japanese male butterfly swimmers
Olympic swimmers of Japan
Swimmers at the 2016 Summer Olympics
Olympic silver medalists for Japan
Medalists at the 2016 Summer Olympics
Olympic silver medalists in swimming
21st-century Japanese people